Hogmaneigh is a flat race horse, trained by Stuart Williams and owned by Lucille Bone.

In June 2007, Hogmaneigh won the Vodafone Dash on Derby Day at Epsom and in September 2008 won the Portland Handicap at Doncaster. In 2006 he was favourite for the Ayr Gold Cup, which is the richest handicap in Europe, but finished 13th.

In September 2008, it was well publicised in the British press that Hogmaneigh had a problem with his feet and that Stuart Williams was buying special shoes for him from America, costing £150 a pair.

External links
 Official website

2003 racehorse births
Thoroughbred family 19
Racehorses bred in the United Kingdom
Racehorses trained in the United Kingdom